Washington Lane station is a SEPTA Regional Rail station at 812–822 East Washington Lane in Philadelphia, Pennsylvania. The station is located in the  Germantown neighborhood.

The station is in zone 2 on the Chestnut Hill East Line, on former Reading Railroad tracks, and is 7.8 track miles from Suburban Station. In 2013, this station saw 163 boardings and 213 alightings on an average weekday. The station is located near the Awbury Arboretum.

Station layout

References

External links
SEPTA - Washington Lane Station
Old Washington Lane RDG Station
 Station from Google Maps Street View

SEPTA Regional Rail stations